Iron Dragon is a suspended roller coaster located at Cedar Point in Sandusky, Ohio. Built in 1987 by Arrow Dynamics, it is located in the Millennium Midway section of the park.

History

Before Iron Dragon's 1987 debut, the Western Cruise (later known as Paddlewheel Excursions) boats circumnavigated the waters around this island. The popular boat ride's station sat on the same part of the midway where Iron Dragon's station rests today. (Riders can still spot the docking cleats welded to the dock while climbing the stairs to the boarding station.) The Monster circular ride used to call the land under Iron Dragon's transfer track home. Monster closed on Labor Day weekend in 1986 so Iron Dragon construction could begin. Planning for Iron Dragon began in 1985, the same year the Frontier Lift cable car ride (similar to the Sky Ride found on Cedar Point's main midway) opened for its final season.

In the early and mid-1990s, a "remote a boat" game was housed in the water under Iron Dragon's final helix element. This was removed in 1997.

With the closure of XLR-8 at Astroworld, Eagle Fortress at Everland, and Big Bad Wolf at Busch Gardens Williamsburg, Iron Dragon became the longest operating suspended roller coaster in the world. Iron Dragon is also the oldest of the five remaining suspended coasters built by Arrow Dynamics.

Characteristics
Iron Dragon's previous color scheme was red track with gray supports, similar paint schemes to that of Ninja at Six Flags Magic Mountain and Vortex at Canada's Wonderland (both are also Arrow suspended swinging coasters). In 2004, the supports were repainted yellow orange.

Virtual reality
In July 2016, Cedar Point began testing the use of virtual reality on Iron Dragon, in which riders wear Samsung Gear VR headsets to experience the 3D digital effects. Availability was limited from 6 – 9 p.m, and guests were required to sign up earlier in the day. Following positive feedback, Cedar Point made the new feature permanent on June 9, 2017, but later removed it on September 8, 2018.

Ride experience

This type of roller coaster features cars that hang beneath the track by a chassis allowing them to swing side to side. Some parts of the ride are built on artificial lagoons, and the track takes riders into wooded areas and over water. Iron Dragon is one of two roller coasters at Cedar Point to utilize two separate lift hills, the other being Cedar Creek Mine Ride. Both hills are built side by side and head in opposite directions.

After departing the station, the ride turns to the right. After ascending the first lift, which travels partially underneath Rougarou's lift hill and first drop, the ride descends down the ride's first drop and then rises into a wide left turn. This leads into a right turn, followed by a slight turn to the left and another turn to the right. The ride descends as it continues right and climbs upward, entering a descending, 270-degree helix. The train then enters a brake run and second lift hill, which moves in the opposite direction as the first. The drop off of the second lift is not very steep, but twists side to side, first going left, then right, then left again. The ride then pulls up, transitioning from a left to a right turn. The next drop curves left slightly, followed by a right-hand turn and drop into a right-hand helix over the lagoon. Water nozzles that spray mist are positioned under the pretzel-shaped helix, although these do not always run. After exiting the helix, the ride dips and rises once more, turns left and then right, followed by the final brake run leading back into the station.

References

External links

 Cedarpoint.com - Official Iron Dragon page
 Official POV of Iron Dragon
 Iron Dragon at The Point Online
  RCDB listing of operating suspended coasters by length
  RCDB listing of Arrow suspended coasters

Cedar Point
Roller coasters introduced in 1987
Roller coasters operated by Cedar Fair
Roller coasters in Ohio
1987 establishments in Ohio